Beli Orlovi ("White Eagles") are the organized supporters of Serbian sport teams and athletes, especially of the Serbia national football team. Besides football, they also support other sport sections of Serbia, especially  basketball, water polo, volleyball, handball, tennis. The name Beli Orlovi refers to the national symbol of Serbia, the double headed white Serbian eagle.

Under the Beli Orlovi gather not only the ordinary Serbian fans, but also members of all Serbian organized supporter groups such as the Delije, Grobari, Firmaši, Meraklije, Crveni Đavoli, Marinci, Plava Unija and others, as one supporter group where counts only the support of Serbia in Sport. Besides Serbia, the Beli Orlovi has also members in Montenegro, Bosnia and Herzegovina, especially in the Bosnian Serb entity Republika Srpska, and Croatia. They also have many supporters in all other former Yugoslavian republics like Macedonia and Slovenia and in the Serbian diaspora, especially in Germany, Austria, Switzerland, Sweden, the United States, Canada and Australia, as well as in the Yugoslav diaspora.

Notes

Serbia national football team
Serbian football supporters' associations
2005 establishments in Serbia